The 2001 NHK Trophy was the final event of six in the 2001–02 ISU Grand Prix of Figure Skating, a senior-level international invitational competition series. It was held at the Aqua Dome Kumamoto in Kumamoto on November 29 – December 2. Medals were awarded in the disciplines of men's singles, ladies' singles, pair skating, and ice dancing. Skaters earned points toward qualifying for the 2001–02 Grand Prix Final. The compulsory dance was the Golden Waltz.

Results

Men

Ladies

Pairs

Ice dancing

External links
 2001 NHK Trophy
 Official site
 https://web.archive.org/web/20120324011522/http://ww2.isu.org/news/gpnhk1.html
 https://web.archive.org/web/20120324011608/http://ww2.isu.org/news/gpnhk2.html
 https://web.archive.org/web/20120324011611/http://ww2.isu.org/news/gpnhk3.html
 https://web.archive.org/web/20120324011616/http://ww2.isu.org/news/gpnhk4.html

Nhk Trophy, 2001
NHK Trophy